Bertram Lenox Simpson (1877–1930) was a British author who wrote about China under the pen name "B. L. Putnam Weale" (or sometimes simply "Putnam Weale"). Lenox Simpson was the son of Clare Lenox-Simpson, who had been in the Chinese Maritime Customs Service since 1861; he had a brother, Evelyn, a mining engineer who worked in China, and a sister, Esme. His education was at Brighton College, after which he too joined the Service. He was in China during the Boxer Rebellion and during the siege of the legations. After this, he became Brigade Interpreter for the British Expeditionary Force (he spoke 5 languages).

Lenox Simpson left the Chinese Maritime Customs Service in 1901, perhaps connected with zealous looting after the siege of the Legations in 1900. One historian calls him "the consummate treaty port jobbing hack, writing commentaries, begging for newspaper work, penning novels... and serving as Daily Telegraph correspondent in Beijing from 1911 to 1914." He remained in China, and began a prolific career writing about China and the Far East. His 1914 novel, The Eternal Princess has the earliest reference as yet located to the apocryphal sign in Shanghai's Huangpu Park, "No Dogs or Chinese." As of 1916 he was working for the political section of the office of the President of China. One researcher reports that "During the period of September 1916 to June 1917, he had written at least thirty-eight reports on foreign affairs for the Chinese government. Many of them were ... read by President Li Yuanhong." His journalistic career in China included periods as editor of the Peking Leader and as chairman of the Far Eastern Times syndicate.

Sir Ernest Satow refused to be introduced to Putnam Weale when he was at Peking (1900–06) 'on account of his character'.

By 1930 Lenox Simpson had become thoroughly embroiled in Chinese internal politics and thus took control of customs in Tianjin on behalf of Yan Xishan. He was killed in what some believed to have been an assassination. This was difficult to conclusively prove, because the killers were never caught or identified.

Works 
His work Indiscreet Letters from Peking is widely cited as an eyewitness account of the events during the siege of the Legations in 1900, but two scholars have cast doubt on its reliability.

A number of his books have recently been republished in facsimile, usually under his pen-name "Putnam Weale". There are free downloads of The Fight for the Republic in China, his best-known work. The Oxford English Dictionary cities his Why China Sees Red as an early example of use of the word term warlord, though The New York Times had used it earlier.

Manchu and Muscovite (1904)
The Re-Shaping of the far east (1905)
 Indiscreet Letters from Peking: Being the Notes of an Eye-Witness, Which Set Forth in Some Detail, from Day to Day, the Real Story of the Siege and Sack of a Distressed Capital in 1900—the Year of Great Tribulation. London: G. Bell, 1906.

The truce in the East and its aftermath (1907)
The coming struggle in eastern Asia (1909)
The conflict of color; being a detailed examination of racial ... (1910)
The Unknown God (1911)
The fight for the republic in China (1917)
The truth about China and Japan (1919)
The Pageant of Peking (1920)
An indiscreet chronicle from the Pacific (1922)
Why China Sees Red (1926)
Chang Tso-Lin's Struggle against the Communist Menace (1927)
China's crucifixion (1928)
The Port of Fragrance (1930)[novel]

References

External links 
 
 
 The Fight for the Republic of China – Free download at Guttenburg
 
 
 List of books by Bertram Lenox Simpson

1877 births
1930 deaths
British expatriates in China
British political writers
People educated at Brighton College
Writers about China